The Gorakhpur Nuclear Power Plant or the Gorakhpur Haryana Anu Vidyut Pariyojana (GHAVP) is a proposed nuclear power plant to be built on a  area west of Gorakhpur village of Fatehabad district of Haryana.

The foundation stone of the 2800 megawatt nuclear power plant was laid on 13 January 2014 by Shri MANMOHAN SINGH (Prime Minister of India). The first phase of the project will have an installed capacity of 1400 MW and was expected to be completed by 2025, however the deadline has been now extended to 2028. The construction of second phase will gather pace afterwards, which will double the capacity to 2800 MW.

History
One year after laying the foundation stone, there was no reactor construction activity. NPCIL carried out only certain pre-project activities on the land. There were problems with the Environment Court at Kurukshetra and over the possession of 28 acres, as owners of the land refused to accept compensation and to vacate the land. Officials said that the government was suffering a financial loss of Rs 7 to 8 crore per day for the delay of the project.

On May 27, 2015, a police force evicted farmers living on a piece of land acquired by the NPCIL. Houses were razed, crops destroyed, and the farmers belongings and cattle carted away. The corporation had taken possession of the major part of land, but farmers owning 28 acres had refused the compensation and were not vacating the land.

In March 2016, still only preparatory activities were made. By 2018, NPCIL had started the procurement activities for this project, as BHEL secured the order for supply of steam generators to this project.

As of April 2022, the foundation piles have been completed for units 1 and 2, while the excavation work for other structures such as cooling towers are in progress. Only pre-project activities had been carried out for units 3 and 4.

Design and specification
The proposed 700 MW IPHWR-700 pressurized heavy water reactors are indigenous and similar to the ones currently under construction in Kakrapar Atomic Power Station (KAPP-3 &4) and Rajasthan Atomic Power Station (RAPP-7 & 8). Also, the reactor size and the design features of 700 MW are similar to that of 540 MWe of Tarapur Atomic Power Station 3 & 4 Units, except that partial boiling of the coolant is up to about 3% (nominal) at the coolant channel exit has been allowed.

Cost and economics
Being built by the Nuclear Power Corporation of India, the project is estimated to cost  as of January 2014.

Units

Updates

 (Mar 2021) First end-shield for pressurized heavy water reactor delivered.
 (July 2021) Godrej & Boyce gets ₹468 Cr order to supply generators for PHWR project
 (July 2021) BHEL awarded steam generator contract for domestic PHWRs
 (Aug 2021) L&T delivers second end-shield for pressurized heavy water reactor 
 (Sep 2021) BHEL wins order for turbine islands

See also 
 Nuclear power in India

References
 

Nuclear power stations in Haryana
Energy in Haryana
Proposed power stations in India